Alfred Valentine "Val or Vic" Rouse (14 February 1897 – 1961) was an English footballer who played for Crewe Alexandra, Port Vale, Stoke, Swansea Town and Wolverhampton Wanderers and was described as a 'gentleman' player.

Career
Rouse was born in Hoddesdon and played for Welsh sides Llanelly and Pontypridd, before joining Wolverhampton Wanderers in 1921. He played five Second Division games for "Wolves" in the 1921–22 campaign, before joining First Division club Stoke in August 1922. He played in 38 matches in 1922–23 as Stoke suffered relegation back to the Second Division. Manager Tom Mather kept faith with Rouse at left-half in 1923–24, and made him captain for the 1924–25 campaign. He scored his first senior goal in a 1–1 draw with Barnsley at the Victoria Ground on 1 November 1924. Despite possessing a strong squad, overall performances on the pitch were below standard and the team went 12 matches without a win (1 January 1925 to 21 March 1925) and were almost relegated. Four wins and three draws in their last eight matches ensured survival by the narrowest of margins, a single point. Rouse was the sold to Swansea Town, but featured just four times for the "Swans" in 1925–26. He left Vetch Field and joined Port Vale in June 1926. He played 29 Second Division matches in the 1926–27 season and then 39 league games in the 1927–28 season, as Vale posted top ten finishes. However he lost his first team place at The Old Recreation Ground in February 1929, and was given a free transfer in May 1929. He spent the 1929–30 and 1930–31 seasons in the Third Division North with Crewe Alexandra, before joining Connah's Quay & Shotton.

Career statistics
Source:

References

1897 births
1961 deaths
People from Hoddesdon
English footballers
Association football wing halves
Llanelli Town A.F.C. players
Pontypridd F.C. players
Wolverhampton Wanderers F.C. players
Stoke City F.C. players
Swansea City A.F.C. players
Port Vale F.C. players
Crewe Alexandra F.C. players
Connah's Quay & Shotton F.C. players
English Football League players